Ingeniero Aeronáutico Ambrosio L.V. Taravella International Airport, more commonly known as Pajas Blancas, is located  north-northwest of the center of Córdoba, the capital city of the Córdoba Province.

Overview

Cordoba is Argentina's third-busiest airport, after Ministro Pistarini International Airport and Aeroparque Jorge Newbery, both of which are located in Buenos Aires.

The airport had been a jetport for a long time, having received commercial jet aircraft services before, but it had been lacking the size to receive larger numbers of passengers until Aeropuertos Argentina 2000, a private company that operates several airports in Argentina, decided to give internal Argentine airports more money so that they could expand and lure more airlines. Up until that moment, the Taravella airport, which was named after an architect, only had one story and one terminal.

The construction of a second and third floor began in 2000, designed by prominent local architect Mario Roberto Álvarez; by 2002, it was finished and Aerolíneas Argentinas decided to make the Taravella airport a hub for domestic flights.

The airport is equipped with the necessary lights to have night air traffic, but pilots flying there, especially pilots of light aircraft, are recommended to look out for birds, as there is quite a substantial number of them inhabiting the areas nearby.

Today, Córdoba Airport primarily serves only domestic and regional destinations across South America. It does have flights to Central America and Europe also.

Airlines and destinations

Statistics

See also 

 List of airports in Argentina
 List of the busiest airports in Argentina
 Transport in Argentina

References

External links 
 
 
 

Airports in Argentina
Buildings and structures in Córdoba, Argentina
Transport in Córdoba Province, Argentina